By the Light of the Green Star is a science fantasy novel by American writer Lin Carter.  Published  by DAW Books in 1974, it is the third novel in his Green Star Series.  In this installment, other (than the one found in the treetop cities such as Phaolon and Ardha) races of Green Star planet humans are introduced.

Plot summary
As Karn ponders on how to get past Klygon (who Gurjan Tor had ordered to kill him in case of failure), Klygon then tells him that they should escape together—as Gurjan Tor will also kill Klygon a "master assassin" even more tortuously, and as Klygon has no wish to kill his only remaining true friend.  The two escape on their black-painted zaiphs tethering them a short distance outside Ardha (as night travel is extremely dangerous).  In the morning, they see a flight of Akhmim's warriors pursuing the sky-sled (which Karn knows they cannot catch, due to its speed exceeding that of any zaiph).  When the two set out for Phaolon at a higher altitude, a huge shadow comes over them.  Klygon looks toward the shadow's source which turns out to be a dinosaur-sized hawklike bird or zawkaw.  They attempt to flee from the zawkaw only to find that its speed exceeds that of their zaiphs; before fleeing Karn observes a beautiful (not in effeminate sense) bald, ebon-skinned human riding it.  At that point, Karn finds the zoukar (an invention of the kaloodha, the lightning-emitting wand which Sarchimus had used to kill the phuol) and slays the zawkaw, panicking its rider who falls from its back into the abyss.  However, he and Klygon are not able to regain control of their zaiphs till these hit the forest floor (which kills the zaiphs).

In the meantime Janchan, Niamh and Zarqa (along with a captive Arjala) prepare to restart after a night spent parked; at this point Arjala's haughtiness comes to the forefront as she criticises the rude breakfast they have—and her feeling of humiliation is aggravated when Niamh reminds her that she (Niamh) too is a Goddess (as Princess/Goddess are integrated in Phaolon).  When they restart the sky-sled at high altitude, they see a large floating city from which zawkaw with ebon-skinned riders (similar to the one that chased Karn and Klygon) flying around it.  A flight of the zawkaw lands near the quartet, who are taken captive by the riders and taken into the city.  There, an old man tells them the city is named Calidar, at which Arjala is initially overjoyed (she had earlier welcomed the ebon-skinned men as her "cousins", though they gave her no recognition)--but her joy is turned to horror as the old man, Nimbalim of Yoth, informs her that she is viewed as merely another captive.  Niamh is thrilled at meeting Nimbalim (whom she had always been told had died a thousand years prior—even his city had been destroyed sometime later by the Blue Barbarians during one of their madness-times).

Karn and Klygon have meantime taken shelter, but are disappointed at the forest floor as it provides only some tasteless (though plentiful) food items.  They are captured by a tribe of albinos who ride on huge earthworms (known as sluth) and taken into caves in the trees' root-networks.  There, they meet a blue-skinned man who identifies himself as "Delgan of the Isles" (the "of the Isles" particularly intrigues Karn who has lived entirely in the treetops), to whom Klygon takes an immediate dislike.  Karn notices that Delgan is rather refined for a "Blue Barbarian" (the only race of which he knows having such skin colour).  The troglodytes, led by Gor-ya, add Klygon and Karn to their herd of slave tenders of grubs known as ygnoum.  Gor-ya also warns them that they must keep the ygnoum safe from enemies he terms kraan.  When the kraan (hippo-sized red ants) later attack the troglodytes and slaughter many of the ygnoum, Gor-ya tries to punish Klygon by whipping him to death, but is stopped when Karn thrusts a torch in his face giving him serious burns—for which Karn is sentenced to be killed by the largest of the sluth (suggested to Gor-ya by Delgan).

One of the younger of the black men of Calidar, Ralidux, finds Arjala fascinating; he discusses this with an elder, Clyon, who attempts to dissuade him.  The travellers (including Nimbalim) plan on escaping Calidar but are initially stymied by the sky-sled's being too small—for which Niamh finds a solution, capturing (and riding) one of the zawkaw.  Eventually, Zarqa is able to tap Ralidux' mind and use him to control a zawkaw—on which Niamh and Arjala ride with him.  The travellers' escape is detected however, and a flight of the zawkaw-riders armed with a pain-rod (less-powerful version of the zoukar) knocks Zarqa (piloting the sky-sled) unconscious.  Janchan then takes control and brings the sky-sled to a stop.

Delgan visits the condemned Karn and gives him his weathercloak, witchlight, rapier and zoukar—and tells him to hurry so they can escape.  As they do so, the troglodytes awaken the huge sluth which pursues the trio.  Karn then pushes a button on the witchlight (warning Delgan and Klygon to cover their eyes), and turns away.  The witchlight has one lightning-bright flash which kills the huge sluth—but the reflection on the water's surface blinds Karn.  The trio escape in a boat made from a fallen leaf to the inland sea, and land on a small isle—where Delgan strikes Klygon unconscious and robs the two of weathercloak, rapiers and zoukar.  Mockingly he states, "in my land, I am a king; I go to reclaim my throne".  Klygon regains consciousness, and he and Karn hear the wings of the zawkaw (piloted by Ralidux, now free of Zarqa's mind-control) overhead.

Followed by As the Green Star Rises.

External links

1974 American novels
1974 fantasy novels
1974 science fiction novels
Novels by Lin Carter
American fantasy novels
DAW Books books